Glenn John Liebhardt (March 10, 1883 – July 13, 1956) was a Major League Baseball pitcher who played for four seasons for the Cleveland Naps from 1906 to 1909.

Glenn's son, Glenn Ignatius Liebhardt, was also a major league pitcher.

External links

1883 births
1956 deaths
People from Wayne County, Indiana
Major League Baseball pitchers
Cleveland Naps players
Baseball players from Indiana
Milwaukee Creams players
Los Angeles (minor league baseball) players
Spokane Indians players
Omaha Rangers players
Rock Island Islanders players
Omaha Rourkes players
St. Joseph Saints players
Memphis Egyptians players
Minneapolis Millers (baseball) players
Memphis Chickasaws players